Safiye Şayan Kadın ("pure" and "Worthy; deserving"; 4 January 1853 – 15 March 1945) was the third Consort of Sultan Murad V of the Ottoman Empire.

Biography
Şayan Kadın was born on January 4, 1853, in Anapa. Her birth name was Safiye Zan and she was the daughter of Zan Batir Bey. Şayan had been formerly a member of the household of scholar Sıddık Molla. She entered the service of the Ottoman palace at a young age and on 5 February 1869 at Dolmabahçe Palace she became the third consort of Murad V, at the time Şehzade. Her exquisite blue eyes, blonde hair, adorning her rose-pink face, made her a marvel in the art of feminine loveliness Murad's love and affection for her made other consorts jealous of her.

After sometime Şayan became pregnant with her first child. Pertevniyal Sultan sent over her palace midwife to abort the child, because at the time it was forbidden for an Ottoman prince to have children before he was sultan and Murad had already obtained two exceptions to the rule. When the midwife arrived to abort the child, Murad obtained permission from Sultan Abdulaziz for this child to be aborted outside the villa. The pregnant Şayan was taken to the home of Dr. Mehmed Emin Pasha for the abortion, but at Murad's request the doctor prepared a harmless concoction for her and sent her back to the prince's villa, while reporting to the palace that he had administrated treatment to induce abortion. Hatice Sultan was born in Murad's villa in Kurbağalıdere on 5 April 1870 and indeed she was brought up concealed in the villa until Murad ascended the throne.

Murad ascended the throne on 30 May 1876, after the deposition of his uncle Sultan Abdulaziz, Şayan was given the title of "Third Kadın". After reigning for three months, Murad was deposed on 30 August 1876, due to mental instability and was imprisoned in the Çırağan Palace. Şayan and her six years old daughter followed him into confinement. In 1878 there was a failed attempt to free Murad and put him back on the throne, the Ali Suavi conspiracy, which was organized by some of Murad's half brothers and sisters (Şehzade Selim Süleyman, Şehzade Ahmed Kemaleddin, Fatma Sultan and Seniha Sultan). After the bankruptcy, Abdülhamid II had iron doors and gratings on the windows put on the Çırağan palace. Frightened by the noise, Murad sent Şayan to see what was going on. She cried to see the new doors and windows and tried to hide the truth from Murad, telling him they were just fixing the doors, but he went to check and saw for himself.

After Murad's death in 1904, according to Filitzen Hanim caused by pain and shame over the scandal caused by Şayan's daughter, Hatice Sultan, she remained in the Çırağan Palace when every one else had left. She declared that "My master died here, as prisoner, and here I will die too.". Until 1908 Resan Hanım, fifth consort, stayed with her, but afterwards she went to live with her daughter Fatma Sultan and Şayan was left alone. Şayan was very attached to Şehzade Ali Vasıb, who called her "third grandmother". Princess Leyla Achba met her at a dinner of Caliph Abdülmecid II and was fascinated by her intelligence and kindness. In 1915 the CPU canceled her salary and she fell into poverty.  She died on  during the Occupation of Constantinople. After the exile of the Ottoman dynasty she lived with Reftarıdil Kadın in Ortaköy. She died on 15 March 1945. In recent years he suffered from senile dementia and was screaming in panic that Abdülhamid II's soldiers were about to break in. She was the last Murad's consort to die.

Issue

In literature
 Şayan is a character in Ayşe Osmanoğlu's historical novel The Gilded Cage on the Bosphorus (2020).

See also
Kadın (title)
Ottoman Imperial Harem
List of consorts of the Ottoman sultans

References

Sources

 
 

1853 births
19th-century consorts of Ottoman sultans
1940s deaths
20th-century consorts of Ottoman sultans